Blom is a surname of Scandinavian, German and Dutch origin. Blom is a Swedish, Danish, Norwegian and Afrikaans term for bloom or flower. In Dutch it is a variant of bloem meaning flour or flower.

Geographical distribution
As of 2014, 30.3% of all known bearers of the surname Blom were residents of South Africa (frequency 1:3,229), 29.6% of the Netherlands (1:1,035), 16.4% of Sweden (1:1,092), 7.7% of the United States (1:84,662), 3.0% of Denmark (1:3,404), 2.2% of Finland (1:4,588), 2.1% of Norway (1:4,433), 1.7% of Germany (1:88,260), 1.3% of Australia (1:33,484) and 1.2% of Canada (1:54,355).

In Sweden, the frequency of the surname was higher than national average (1:1,092) in the following counties:
 1. Gävleborg County (1:499)
 2. Uppsala County (1:584)
 3. Jämtland County (1:626)
 4. Västmanland County (1:750)
 5. Jönköping County (1:791)
 6. Värmland County (1:841)
 7. Södermanland County (1:892)
 8. Dalarna County (1:903)
 9. Västra Götaland County (1:904)
 10. Norrbotten County (1:936)
 11. Örebro County (1:1,019)

In the Netherlands, the frequency of the surname was higher than national average (1:1,035) in the following provinces:
 1. North Holland (1:752)
 2. Utrecht (1:833)
 3. South Holland (1:846)
 4. Flevoland (1:906)
 5. Gelderland (1:941)

In South Africa, the frequency of the surname was higher than national average (1:3,229) in the following provinces:
 1. Northern Cape (1:1,037)
 2. Eastern Cape (1:1,433)
 3. Western Cape (1:1,928)
 4. Free State (1:2,365)
 5. North West (1:2,424)

Notable people named Blom
 Alice Blom (born 1980), Dutch volleyball player
 Anna Blom (born 1976), Swedish curler
 Anton Blom (1924–2012), Norwegian journalist and author
 August Blom (1869–1947), Danish film director
 Birger Blom-Kalstø (1940–2011), Norwegian politician
 (1737–1815), Swedish physician and apostle of Linnaeus
 Carl Peter Blom (1762–1818), Swedish sailor 
 Christian Blom (1782–1861), Norwegian ship owner and composer
 (1822–1900), Finnish general
 Donald Blom (born 1949), American suspected serial killer
 Edward Blom (born 1970), Swedish archivist
 Ellen Blom (born 1979), Norwegian ski mountaineer
 Eric Blom (1888–1959), Swiss-born British music lexicographer of Danish origin
 Frans Blom (1893–1963), Danish explorer and archeologist
 Fredrik Blom (1781–1853), Swedish architect
 Fredrik C. Blom (1893–1970), Norwegian businessperson
 Gertrude Blom (1901–1993), Swiss journalist, anthropologist, photographer
Gijs Blom (born 1997), Dutch actor
 Gustav Peter Blom (1785–1869), Norwegian politician
 Gustava Kielland née Blom (1800–1889), Norwegian missionary pioneer
  (born 1943), Dutch historian, director of the NIOD
 Hans Jensen Blom (1812–1875), Norwegian politician
 Hans Willem Blom (born 1947), Dutch Professor of Social and Political Philosophy
 Herman Blom (1885–1963), Dutch actor, screenwriter and playwright
  (1906–1996), Swedish architect
 Ida Blom (1931–2016), Norwegian historian
 Ingrid Blom Sheldon (born 1945), U.S. mayor
 Jandré Blom (born 1984), South African rugby union player
  (born 1965), Dutch jazz saxophonist
 Jassina Blom (born 1994), Belgian footballer
 Jyrki Blom (born 1962), Finnish javelin thrower
 Kaj Blom (born 1925), Danish chess master
 Kees Blom (born 1946), Dutch ecologist
 Kevin Blom (born 1974), Dutch football referee
 Kimmo Blom (born 1970), Finnish vocalist and stage artist
 Kirsti Blom (born 1953), Norwegian author
 Knut Blom (1916–1996), Norwegian judge
 Laura Betterly-Blom, U.S. Spam Queen
 Louis Blom-Cooper (1926–2018), British lawyer and writer
 Maria Blom (born 1971), Swedish film director, dramatist and screenwriter
 Merel Blom (born 1986), Dutch equestrian
 Morné Blom (born 1989), Namibian rugby player
 Otto Blom (1887–1972), Dutch tennis player
 Per Blom (born 1946), Norwegian film director
 Per Blom (born 1949), Norwegian sprint canoeist
 Philipp Blom (born 1970), German novelist and historian
 Piet Blom (1934–1999), Dutch architect
 Stefan Blom (born 1963) South African contemporary artist, sculptor. 
 Reinier Blom (1867–1943), Dutch gymnast
 Rens Blom (born 1977), Dutch pole vaulter
 Rolf Blom (fl. 1980s), Swedish cryptographer who developed the Blom's scheme protocol
 Thomas Blom Hansen (born 1958), Danish anthropologist
 Tobbe Blom (born 1975), Swedish magician and television host
 Tommy Blom (born 1947), Swedish singer and radio host
 Tore Blom (1880–1961), Swedish athlete
 Viktor Blom (born 1990), Swedish poker player
Wilma M. Blom, marine scientist

See also
Bloem, short for Bloemfontein
Blohm
Blome (disambiguation)
Bloom (disambiguation)
Blum (disambiguation)

References

Danish-language surnames
Dutch-language surnames
Norwegian-language surnames
Swedish-language surnames